Thomas Withers, Jr. (28 May 1886 – 25 Jun 1953), was a Rear Admiral in the United States Navy.

Withers graduated from the U.S. Naval Academy in 1906. He later became qualified in and commanded submarines. At the beginning of World War II, he was Commander, Submarine Force, U.S. Pacific Fleet. There he championed the reliability and efficacy of the Mark 14 torpedo, at a time when submarine captains were discovering that the magnetic detonators for the torpedo were ineffective.
Not very long after he was reassigned to Portsmouth Naval Shipyard in 1942 for the remainder of the war. Withers retired from the Navy in 1946 as a Rear Admiral with forty years of naval service. He died in Coronado, California, in 1953 and was buried at Arlington National Cemetery, in Virginia.

References 

United States Navy rear admirals (upper half)
1886 births
1953 deaths
United States Naval Academy alumni
United States Navy personnel of World War II
People from Nelson County, Virginia
Burials at Arlington National Cemetery
United States submarine commanders